Bibliography of early American publishers and printers is a selection of books, journals and other publications devoted to these topics covering their careers and other activities before, during and just after the American Revolution. Various works that are not primarily devoted to those topics, but whose content devotes itself to them in significant measure, are sometimes included here also. Works about Benjamin Franklin, a famous printer and publisher, among other things, are too numerous to list in this bibliography, can be found at Bibliography of Benjamin Franklin, and are generally not included here unless they are greatly devoted to Franklin's printing career. Single accounts of printers and publishers that occur in encyclopedia articles are neither included here.

Scholarly textbooks

A
 

 

 

 

 

 

 

 

 

B
  (Google book)

 

  -- 2014 publication

 

 

 

 

 

 

 

  Google link

 

 

 

 

C

 

 

 

  – (contains much coverage of the emergence and involvement of the printing industry in Connecticut)

 

 

 

 

D
 

 

 

 

 

   (Contains numerous references to printing)

 

 

E
  See also: (Google book)

 

 

 

 

F
 

 

 

 

  Google book

 

 

 

G
 

 

 

 

 

 

 

H
 

 

 

 

 

 

 

 

 

 

   Alternative listing

 

 

 

 

 

 

I
 

J
 

 

K
 

 

 

 

 

L
 

 

  ( Alternative publication )

 

 

 

 

 

 

 

 

 

M
 

 

 

 

 

 

 

 

 

 

 

 

 

 

 

 

 

 

 

 

N
 

 

 

 

 

O
 

P
 

 

  -- alternative Google link

R
 

 

  (Alternative source)

 

 

 

 

 

 

S
 

 

 

 

 

 

 

 

 

 

 

 

 

 
 

 

T
 

 

 

 

 

 

 

U
 
 

V
 

 

W
 

 

 

 

 

 

 

 

 

 

 

 

Y
 

 

Z

Historical journals
A
 

 

B
 

 

 

 

 

C
 

 

 

 

 

 

 

D
 

 

E
 

 

 

F
 

 

 

 

 

G
 

 

H
 

 

 

 

 

I
 

 

J
 
 
 

K
 

L
 

 

 

 

M
 

 

 

 

 

 

 

 

 

 

 

 

 

 

N
 

P
 

 

 

R
 

 

 

 

S
 

 

 

 

 

 

   See also: Open Library

 

 

 

 

 

 

 

 

T
 

 

V
 

W
 

 

 

 

Z

Primary sources

See also
 List of early American publishers and printers
 History of printing
 History of journalism
 History of American newspapers
 History of newspaper publishing
 Colonial history of the United States
 Newspapers of colonial America

American printers
American print editors
18th-century American businesspeople
Colonial American printers
18th-century history books